Woman on Top is a 2000 American fantasy romantic comedy film directed by Fina Torres, written by Vera Blasi, and starring Penélope Cruz, Murilo Benício, Harold Perrineau Jr., and Mark Feuerstein.

Plot
All her life, Isabella has suffered from motion sickness. Because of her illness, she couldn't play much with other children. She stayed at home and learned how to cook, becoming a renowned chef as an adult. She fell in love with Toninho and they opened a restaurant together, with Isabella stuck in the kitchen and Toninho out front taking the credit.

The only way for Isabella to control her motion sickness is to control her motion. She must drive rather than ride in a car, take stairs instead of elevators, lead while dancing, and be on top during coitus. Toninho, feeling emasculated and resentful of this, has an affair with a neighbor. Isabella flees Brazil for San Francisco with her Afro-Brazilian transsexual friend Monica, who spent her early years with her in the fishing community of Salvador. Despite old job offers from a number of restaurants, Isabella is unable to find a job until she takes over a cooking class at a local culinary school. Cliff, a neighbor and local television producer, smells her cooking, follows her to class, and signs her to host a live cooking show, Passion Food. She makes Monica her assistant on the show. Isabella performs a sacrifice to Yemanja, a Brazilian sea goddess, to harden her heart and make her never love Toninho again.

Back in Brazil, Toninho's restaurant is floundering without Isabella. Toninho curses Yemanja, and the fishermen stop catching any fish. He figures out that Isabella has gone to Monica and follows her to San Francisco. He spots her on television and tracks her to the studio. With a group of local street musicians, Toninho sneaks into the studio and onto the set, serenading Isabella on the live broadcast. Cliff hires Toninho and the musicians for the show over Isabella's objections. Isabella pursues a relationship with Cliff but Toninho continues trying to win her back.

Network executives offer to syndicate Isabella's show nationally, but only after demanding a number of changes, including firing Monica. With the restaurant closed, Toninho apologizes to Yemanja, but tells her to "stay out of [his] business" with Isabella. He quits the show and makes another attempt to win back Isabella. Isabella goes after him but has to take an elevator, and her motion sickness slows her enough to allow Toninho to depart. Isabella also quits the show rather than accept the changes demanded by the network.

Isabella, with her love still gone but now wanting it returned, tries to cook another sacrifice to Yemanja but finds her cooking talent is gone. Undaunted, Monica substitutes some boxed macaroni and cheese. Isabella makes the second offering but nearly drowns. She has a vision of Yemanja, who rejects her new offering.

Isabella goes to collect her things from the television studio. Toninho, sent by Monica, shows up and suggests they cook something together. As they cook, the fish return to the village waters and Yemanja returns Isabella's original offering along with her love for Toninho.

The film closes with Toninho and Isabella operating a new restaurant as equal partners and with Cliff and Monica as a couple.

Cast 
 Penélope Cruz as Isabella Oliveira
 Analu De Castro as 2-year-old Isabella
 Thais De Sá Curvelo as 5-year-old Isabella
 Murilo Benício as Toninho Oliveira
 Harold Perrineau Jr. as Monica Jones
 Mark Feuerstein as Cliff Lloyd
 John De Lancie as Alex Reeves
 Wagner Moura as Rafi
 Ana Gasteyer as Claudia Hunter
 Anne Ramsay as TV director
 Eliana Guttman as Isabella's mother
 Eduardo Mattedi as Isabella's father

Production
The film was shot on location in Salvador, Brazil and San Francisco, United States. Drag queen RuPaul read multiple times for the part of Monica Jones, which eventually went to Perrineau Jr.

Release
The film premiered in the Un Certain Regard section at the 2000 Cannes Film Festival and screened at the Munich International Film Festival on June 24, 2000 before receiving a North American theatrical release by Fox Searchlight Pictures on September 22, 2000.

Critical response
Woman on Top received mixed reviews from critics. Metacritic reports a 41 out of 100 rating, based on 31 critics, indicating "mixed or average reviews". On Rotten Tomatoes, the film holds a 34% score based on 97 reviews, with an average rating of 4.7/10. The site's consensus: 

Audiences polled by CinemaScore gave the film an average grade of "C" on an A+ to F scale.

Box office
The film opened at #10 at the North American box office, earning $2,008,191 in its opening weekend. Ultimately, the film grossed $5,020,111 in North America playing at a high of 1,086 theaters; overseas, it grossed $5,174,163 for a worldwide total of $10,194,274, becoming a modest box office success against an $8 million budget.

References

External links
 
 
 
 

2000 films
2000s English-language films
2000s Portuguese-language films
2000s fantasy comedy films
2000 LGBT-related films
2000 romantic comedy films
2000s romantic fantasy films
American fantasy comedy films
American LGBT-related films
American romantic comedy films
American romantic fantasy films
Cooking films
Films scored by Luis Bacalov
Films directed by Fina Torres
Films set in Brazil
Films set in San Francisco
Films shot in San Francisco
Films shot in Salvador, Bahia
Fox Searchlight Pictures films
Transgender-related films
LGBT-related romantic comedy films
2000s American films